"Karma" is a song by American singer and songwriter Alicia Keys, taken from her second studio album, The Diary of Alicia Keys (2003).  Written by Keys, Kerry Brothers, Jr., and Taneisha Smith, the song takes influence from hip hop and classical music. It was released as the album's fourth and final single on November 1, 2004, by J Records. Peaking at number 20 on the US Billboard Hot 100 and number 17 on the US Billboard Hot R&B/Hip-Hop Songs, it's the album's only single not to top a Billboard chart. A mashup of "Karma" with Stevie Wonder's 1972 hit "Superstition" titled "Karmastition", produced by Go Home Productions, was also released.

Content
In the song, the narrator's lover who had left her returns and wants to start a new relationship, but she has moved on. Her lover is now in the position she was once in, and in being rejected receives their just deserts ("what goes around comes around"). The title references the popular conception of karma as getting what one deserves.

Music video
The music video for "Karma", directed by Chris Robinson and Keys herself, was filmed over three days in August 2004, with parts shot in New York City and at Casa de Campo resort's Altos de Chavón amphitheatre, in La Romana, Dominican Republic. At the 2005 MTV Video Music Awards, the video earned Keys the award for Best R&B Video.

Track listings and formats

 US 12-inch single
A1. "Karma" (album version) – 4:12
A2. "Karma" (instrumental) – 4:11
B1. "Karma" (KrucialKeys DJ mix) – 3:20
B2. "Karma" (acappella) – 3:45

 European CD single
 "Karma" – 4:15
 "Diary" (Hani mix) – 3:49

 European CD maxi-single
 "Karma" (radio edit) – 3:37
 "Diary" (Hani mix) – 3:49
 "Karma" (the Reggaeton mix) – 3:32
 "Karma" (club mix) – 3:18
 "Karma" (video)

Personnel
Alicia Keys – lead vocals, backing vocals, piano
Kerry "Krucial" Brothers – producer, digital programming, engineer, instrumentation
Manny Marroquin – mixing
Herb Powers Jr. – mastering
Joe Romano – horn
David Watson – horn

Charts

Weekly charts

Year-end charts

Certifications

Release history

See also
 Billboard Year-End Hot 100 singles of 2005

References

External links
 Karma at Discogs

2003 songs
2004 singles
Alicia Keys songs
J Records singles
Music videos directed by Chris Robinson (director)
Songs written by Alicia Keys
Songs written by Kerry Brothers Jr.